Hyderabad Sky is an Indian professional basketball team located in Hyderabad, India. The team competes in India's UBA Pro Basketball League.

Players

Current roster

References

External links
Facebook Page

Basketball teams in India
Basketball teams established in 2015